Randy Baumann is a radio personality, best known for his work as host of Randy Baumann and the DVE Morning Show on WDVE in Pittsburgh, Pennsylvania, USA. From 2000 to 2011, he co-hosted the show with Jim Krenn as Jim Krenn, Randy Baumann and the DVE Morning Show until Krenn left WDVE in December 2011.

Before joining the DVE Morning Show in 2000, Baumann was an announcer for Rocket 101, WRKT in Erie, Pennsylvania, using the on-air name "Buckethead".  Baumann's brother, Charlie Baumann, was a kicker at West Virginia University and for the New England Patriots.

See also
Scott Paulsen
Jim Krenn
Bill Crawford

References

External links
 Randy Baumann and the DVE Morning Show blog

1972 births
American male comedians
21st-century American comedians
Living people
People from Erie, Pennsylvania
Radio personalities from Pittsburgh